Maracanã River may refer to:

 Maracanã River (Amazonas), Brazil
 Maracanã River (Pará), Brazil
 Maracanã River (Rio de Janeiro), Brazil

See also 
 Maracanã (disambiguation)